Rosarita Tawil is a Lebanese humanitarian activist, model, fashion designer and beauty pageant title-holder who was crowned Miss Lebanon 2008.

Early life
Tawil was born on July 23 1988 in Beirut, Lebanon having graduated with honors from both College Notre-Dame de Jamhour and the American University of Beirut having studied Business Administration American University of Beirut (AUB).

Tawil speaks four languages: her native Arabic, English, French, Spanish.

Career
Her big break came in 2008 where she was crowned Miss Lebanon 2008. She represented Lebanon in South Africa Johannesburg  in the Miss World 2008 Pageant, where she placed in the top 10 finalists of The Miss World Beach Beauty contest. 

In 2013 she participated and finished runner-up in the inaugural season of Dancing with the Stars Middle East Edition which was broadcast to over 300 million viewers across the Arab world.

Since then Tawil has appeared on the covers and in the editorials of fashion magazines such as Vogue, Harper's Bazaar, ELLE, Grazia, Cosmopolitan, Sayidaty, Laha, Annahar, Al Watan Voice, Elfagr, elmshaher,  khabar 3ajel.

Tawil has worked with several prominent global and regional brands from potshot to walking the catwalk which include Pepsi, Yessayan Jewelry, Miss Sixty, Rasha Chic Couture Kuwait, Versace, Mtc Zain, Make up forever, Wella Beauty, Chopard, Elie Saab, Georges Hobeika, Beirut marathon, Rotana, Mouawad Jewelry.

Acting and hosting
In 2016, Tawil began her acting debut co-hosting the daily show BLIVE on LBC Sat and Rotana, the number 1 daily magazine show in KSA, which covered fashion, beauty, nutrition, styling, sports, psychology, technology, social media, arts and medical issues with local and regional guests.

In 2018/2019, Tawil produced a humanitarian mini web series "We are all Beauty Queens" where she interviewed marginalised women as part of a women's empowerment campaign, shedding light on their tragic stories and helping them regain confidence by "glamming them up" improving their self confidence and showing them that they are beautiful, that we are all beauty queens.

Philanthropy
Known for her humanitarian work, Tawil was appointed PR Ambassador for the RJLiban NGO, helping Lebanese immigrants around the world reconnect with Lebanon. Her main focus was Latin America where she built a strong and powerful network within the Lebanese Brazilian, Mexican and Argentinean communities.

External links
 Official Facebook

1988 births
Living people
Artists from Beirut
Miss World 2008 delegates
Lebanese female models
American University of Beirut alumni
Lebanese beauty pageant winners
Lebanese Christians